Demented may refer to dementia. Other uses include:

Demented (1980 film), an American film
Le Dernier des fous, a French film